The women's +87 kg competition at the 2019 World Weightlifting Championships was held on 26 and 27 September 2019.

Schedule

Medalists

Records

Results

New records

References

Results 

Women's 87+ kg
2019 in women's weightlifting